Glostrup Idræts Club is a Danish sports club from Glostrup, founded on 17 April 1918.

It has sections for athletics, basketball, table tennis, gymnastics and volleyball. Since 2003 the football department is a part of Glostrup FK.

External links
Official site 

Sports teams in Denmark
Athletics clubs in Denmark
Defunct football clubs in Denmark
Sports clubs established in 1918
Association football clubs established in 1918
1918 establishments in Denmark